Intruder in the Dust is a 1949 crime drama film produced and directed by Clarence Brown and starring David Brian, Claude Jarman Jr. and Juano Hernandez. The film is based on the 1948 novel Intruder in the Dust by William Faulkner.

Plot
The film closely follows the plot line of the Faulkner novel. It tells the story of Lucas Beauchamp, (pronounced 'Bee-cham'), a respectable and independent black man, who is unjustly accused of the murder of white man Vinson Gowrie. Through the help of two teenage boys, the town lawyer and an elderly lady, he is able to prove his innocence.

Cast
 Juano Hernandez as Lucas Beauchamp
 David Brian as John Gavin Stevens  
 Claude Jarman Jr. as Chick Mallison
 Porter Hall as Nub Gowrie
 Elizabeth Patterson as Miss Eunice Habersham
 Will Geer as Sheriff Hampton
 Charles Kemper as Crawford Gowrie
 David Clarke as Vinson Gowrie
 Elzie Emanuel as Aleck
 Lela Bliss as Mrs. Mallison
 Harry Hayden as Mr. Mallison
 Harry Antrim as Mr. Tubbs, prison warder
 Dan White as Will Legate, jailhouse guard
 Gene Roper as son of country store owner

Production
Clarence Brown, who had been born in Massachusetts but was raised in Tennessee, wanted to do a film version of the book when it was released in 1948. As a mainstay of MGM for over two decades, he asked studio head Louis B. Mayer about doing a film adaptation, but he had his doubts over whether it would be a profitable venture. Dore Schary, recently brought in as a vice president of production, gave support to Brown, which allowed the film to go through. Brown insisted on filming in Oxford, Mississippi, where Faulkner had lived in for most of his life.

Reception
According to Metro-Goldwyn-Mayer records the film earned $643,000 in the U.S. and Canada and $194,000 elsewhere, for a worldwide box office of $837,000.

In 1950, David Brian and Juano Hernandez were respectively nominated for Best Supporting Actor and Most Promising Newcomer – Male at the 7th Golden Globe Awards. The film was listed as one of the ten best of the year by The New York Times. Faulkner said of the film: "I'm not much of a moviegoer, but I did see that one. I thought it was a fine job. That Juano Hernandez is a fine actor--and man, too."

More than 50 years later, in 2001, film historian Donald Bogle wrote that Intruder in the Dust broke new ground in the cinematic portrayal of blacks, and Hernandez's "performance and extraordinary presence still rank above that of almost any other black actor to appear in an American movie." The film has been praised by Ralph Ellison and the New York Times.

Of the various race-related features released in 1949 (such as this film and Pinky, released months earlier), author Ralph Ellison cited Intruder in the Dust as “the only film that could be shown in Harlem without arousing unintended laughter, for it is the only one of the four in which Negroes can make complete identification with their screen image.”

On Rotten Tomatoes, the film holds a rating of 93% from 41 reviews.

See also

References

External links
 
 
 
 

1949 films
1949 crime drama films
American black-and-white films
American crime drama films
Films about miscarriage of justice
Films about race and ethnicity
Films based on American novels
Films based on works by William Faulkner
Films directed by Clarence Brown
Films scored by Adolph Deutsch
Films set in Mississippi
Films shot in Mississippi
Metro-Goldwyn-Mayer films
1940s English-language films
1940s American films